James Collins (born 28 May 1978) is an English former professional footballer who played in The Football League for Crewe Alexandra. 

He is currently Assistant Interim Head Coach at Wolverhampton Wanderers. 

He is also Head Coach of the Wolverhampton Wanderers U21’s. 

Collins holds the UEFA Pro licence, UEFA - A licence and is one of 16 selected coaches to graduate on the Level 5 elite coaches award.

Collins made his Crewe debut in a 3–3 draw at Bury on 26 August 1997, and just over a year later scored his first Crewe goal in a 2–1 win over Bradford City on 28 August 1998.

References

External links

1978 births
Living people
Footballers from Liverpool
Association football midfielders
English footballers
Crewe Alexandra F.C. players
Northwich Victoria F.C. players
Kidderminster Harriers F.C. players
Halesowen Town F.C. players
English Football League players

Wolverhampton Wanderers F.C. non-playing staff
Association football coaches
Crewe Alexandra F.C. non-playing staff